The Global Amateur Radio Emergency Communications Conference or GAREC is a yearly conference held by the International Amateur Radio Union for discussion of amateur radio operation during natural disasters and other emergencies with the motto, "Saving lives through emergency communications". GAREC was first held in Tampere, Finland in 2005, coinciding with the adoption of the Tampere Convention, a globally binding emergency communications treaty that had been signed in Tampere in 1998. In later conferences, the venue has attempted to rotate in sequence through ITU Regions 1, 2 and 3 (though not necessarily in that order).

Subsequent conferences

References

Amateur radio emergency communications organizations